Ralph Stawell Dutton, 8th Baron Sherborne (1898–1985), was the 8th and last Baron Sherborne. He created the gardens at Hinton Ampner near Alresford in Hampshire, England, and on his death left the house and garden to the National Trust. It is now open to the public.

Early life
Ralph Dutton was born on 25 August 1898. Ralph Dutton was the only son of Henry John Dutton (1847–1935) and Eleanor Cave (1866-1946), the third of four children, with two elder sisters and one younger sister.

He attended West Downs, a Preparatory School near Winchester, before studying at Eton College.  After Eton, he went to Oxford University, where he formed the Uffizi Society, and later also studied at Cirencester Agricultural College.

He started to create the garden at Hinton Ampner in the 1930s, with funding from his father. Previously, the parkland came directly up to the house, which was designed to be a hunting lodge. He worked for a time for the College of Arms and Lloyd's of London, while living in Eaton Square in London.

Owner of Hinton Ampner
In 1935, on the death of his father he inherited Hinton Ampner. The house, originally built in 1793, was remodelled extensively in 1867. On the death of his father Ralph Dutton commissioned architects Gerald Wellesley and Trenwith Wills to restore it to its Georgian appearance, worked carried out from 1936-39. It was badly damaged by fire in 1960, but Dutton restored it again.

Dutton collected paintings, hung in the house, including a set of paintings of the four seasons by Jacob de Wit, depicting cherubs painted in a three-dimensional monochrome style. He also had a well-stocked library in the house, which was damaged in the fire.

Dutton was appointed High Sheriff of Hampshire for 1944. He was an executive member of the National Arts Collection Fund.

Baron Sherborne

A great-grandson of John Dutton, 2nd Baron Sherborne, Ralph Dutton became the 8th Baron Sherborne on the death of his cousin Charles Dutton, 7th Baron Sherborne, in 1982. With no direct heirs and unmarried, he gave his estate, including Hinton Ampner, to the National Trust on his death on 20 April 1985.

Writings
Dutton authored the book A Hampshire Manor that chronicles the history of the manor at Hinton Ampner and its gardens. The book also includes, under the chapter on the 18th century, details concerning the well-documented haunting.

Other non-fiction books authored by the 8th Baron Sherborne:
The English Country House [1935]
The English Garden [1937]
The Land of France (with Lord Holden) [1939]
The English Interior [1948]
Wessex [1950]
The Age of Wren [1951]
London Homes [1952]
Normandy and Brittany [1953]
The Victorian Home [1954]
The Châteaux of France [1957]
English Court Life [1963]

References 

1898 births
1985 deaths
People from the City of Winchester
English gardeners
High Sheriffs of Hampshire
Ralph